L'Odissea may refer to:
 The Odyssey (1968 miniseries), or L'Odissea, a European TV miniseries
 L'Odissea (1911 film), an Italian silent film

See also
 The Odyssey (disambiguation)